Herbert Sohler (25 July 1908, Attendorn, Westphalia – 22 June 1991) was a German U-boat commander during World War II.

Career 
He commanded  from 4 April to 31 July 1938. He then commanded  from 2 November 1938 to 21 May 1940 for five patrols - he sank only two ships (City of Mandalay in convoy HG-3 on 17 October 1939 and the Norwegian ship Rudolf on 21 December the same year) and so was replaced as U-46 's commander by Engelbert Endrass. Sohler had also been deputy commander of 7th U-boat Flotilla from May to September 1940, before taking over full command of it from September 1940 until February 1942.

References

Bibliography

External links 

1908 births
1991 deaths
U-boat commanders (Kriegsmarine)
People from Olpe (district)
People from the Province of Westphalia
Military personnel from North Rhine-Westphalia